Howard Timms (born 9 July 1944) is a British racewalker. He competed in the men's 50 kilometres walk at the 1972 Summer Olympics.

References

1944 births
Living people
Athletes (track and field) at the 1972 Summer Olympics
British male racewalkers
Olympic athletes of Great Britain
Place of birth missing (living people)